CCGS Waban-Aki was a Canadian Coast Guard hovercraft based at CCG Hovercraft Base Trois-Rivières in Trois-Rivières, Quebec. Its name is derived from the First Nations term Wabanaki meaning "people of the dawn". The primary missions of Waban-Aki were icebreaking and performing search and rescue missions in the Saint Lawrence River and its navigable tributaries. Occasionally Waban-Aki performed navigation aid maintenance.

Description
The vessel was crewed by four personnel including three officers.

Construction and career
After developing operational experience with Voyageur, a prototype hovercraft in service with the CCG, on the Saint Lawrence River the CCG sought to replace the aging hovercraft in 1985. In 1986, the British Hovercraft Corporation offered a variant of its AP.1-88 passenger ferry hovercraft design to Canada which was accepted and construction started at Cowes, England. The vessel was launched and completed in mid 1987. The vessel was commissioned into the CCG on 15 July 1987 as Waban-Aki, a First Nations term meaning "people of the dawn". The hovercraft underwent sea trials before arriving in Montreal, Quebec in August 1987 and began operations in October. Waban-Aki was homeported at CCG Hovercraft Base Trois-Rivières, Trois-Rivières-Ouest, Quebec - Quebec Region and given the identifier CH-CGC.

Due to the high volume of shipping in the Canadian Saint Lawrence and the requirement to keep the shipping lanes open year round, CCG hovercraft in Eastern Canada are primarily tasked with icebreaking, with secondary tasks such as performing search and rescue missions and navigation aid maintenance.

See also

Citations

References

External links
 Correo Orinoco, Video and text on hovercraft operation on Rio Orinoco, possibly of former Waban-Aki.

Ships built on the Isle of Wight
1987 ships
Trois-Rivières
Ships of the Canadian Coast Guard